Bello Musa Kofarmata (12 May 1988 – 2 November 2022) was a Nigerian footballer who played as a forward for Kano Pillars, Heartland F.C., Ifeanyi Ubah and El-Kanemi Warriors.

Club career
With the team, with Kano Pillars he won the 2007–08 Nigerian Premier League and was with 11 goals the top scorer. In August 2008 he was on a trial at Austria's LASK and played one friendly game, the forward returned from Europe to Kano Pillars at the start of the 2008 season.

Kofarmata joined Heartland in January 2010 for a fee of five million naira. After two and half years he left Heartland F.C. and signed with league rivals Kano Pillars.

International career
Kofarmata was a fringe player of the Nigeria U20 national team's squad at the 2007 FIFA U20 World Cup. He made his debut for the Nigeria senior national team on 3 March 2010, coming on as a substitute in a 5–2 home win over Congo DR.

Death
Kofarmata died following a short illness on 2 November 2022, at the age of 34.

References

External links

1988 births
2022 deaths
Association football forwards
Nigerian expatriates in Norway
Nigerian footballers
Nigeria international footballers
Nigeria under-20 international footballers
Heartland F.C. players
Kano Pillars F.C. players
Sportspeople from Kano
Abuja F.C. players
Ifeanyi Ubah F.C. players
El-Kanemi Warriors F.C. players